Devi Lal twice became Chief Minister of Haryana. First time he was chief minister from 21 June 1977 to 28 June 1979. Here is the list of ministers in his first ministry:

Ministers
Devi Lal, Chief Minister
Mangal Sein, Industries Minister
Ran Singh, Agriculture Minister
Mool Chand Jain, Finance Minister 
Verander Singh, Irrigation & Power Minister 
Bhajan Lal, Cooperation & Dairy Development Minister
Prit Singh, Revenue Minister 
Bir Singh, Development Minister
Lachhman Singh, Public Works Minister 
Kamla Verma, Health & Printing & Stationery Minister 
Ram Lal Wadhwa, Local Government Minister
Hira Nand, Education Minister 
Mehar Singh Rathi, Jails Cultural Affairs Minister
Sher Singh, Excise & Taxation Minister
Gajraj Bahadur Nagar, Food & Supplies Minister

See also
Second Devi Lal ministry (1987–1989)

References

Janata Party state ministries
Lal
1977 establishments in Haryana
1979 disestablishments in India
Cabinets established in 1977
Cabinets disestablished in 1979